House of the Damned is a 1996 American zombie horror comedy film that was written and directed by Sean Weathers. It was first released on August 20, 1996 through Full Circle Filmworks, but was re-released in 2011 through Music Video Distributors (MVD). The film is Weathers' first film and was dedicated to his best friend and script supervisor Jahvaughn Lambert, who committed suicide before the film was finished editing.

Plot 
After the gruesome and mysterious murder of her father, Liz goes back home for answers, only to be greeted by more questions and the horrible possibility that her mother may be the killer. Before Liz can comprehend everything going on around her, she finds that the murder was just a ruse to get her home and that she is the killer's true target.

Cast 
 Valerie Alexander as Liz 
 Blue as Heather
 Glenn "Illa" Skeete as Ben
 Monica Williams as Emily
 Buddy Love as David
 Johnny Black as Nahum
 Walter Romney as Steve
 Kendra Ware as Stacy
 Clinton Philbert as Kevin

Reception
In a mixed review, Bill Gibron of DVD Talk wrote that while it was "barely watchable at times" it was "mostly enjoyable" and "does grab us with its uniqueness and backdrop". HorrorNews.net's review was slightly more positive, remarking on the film's uniqueness and commenting that the film's "over the top" feeling "[added] to the charm of the film".  David Johnson of DVD Verdict wrote that the film was barely comprehensible and horribly executed.  Rod MacDonald of SF Crowsnest wrote that it is "excruciating to watch".

See also 
 List of zombie films
 List of post-1960s films in black-and-white
 Boston in fiction

References

External links
 
 
 

1996 films
1990s comedy horror films
American black-and-white films
American comedy horror films
American independent films
American zombie comedy films
1996 directorial debut films
1996 comedy films
1990s English-language films
1990s American films
1996 independent films
English-language comedy horror films